How to Make Friends and Influence People is the second album by the rock band Terrorvision, released in 1994 on Total Vegas Recordings. "Oblivion", "Middleman", "Pretend Best Friend", "Alice What's the Matter", and "Some People Say" were all released as singles. The title refers to the Dale Carnegie book How to Win Friends and Influence People. The album was recorded in 17 days.

Production
How to Make Friends and Influence People was recorded with producer Gil Norton and engineer Al Clay; they were assisted by engineer Mike Cyr. Norton and Chris Sheldon mixed the album at The Church in London, with assistance from Elliot Ness and John McDonnell.

Anniversary tours
The 15th anniversary of the release of the album was commemorated by tours in April and December 2009, whereby the band played the entire album from start to finish; the first time the album has been played live in its entirety. During the first leg of the tour, at the larger venues a recording of the show was available for purchase immediately afterwards.

The album was played in full again in May 2019 during a short UK tour to commemorate its 25th anniversary.

Track listing
All tracks written by Terrorvision.

"Alice What's the Matter"  – 2:43
"Oblivion"  – 3:03
"Stop the Bus"  – 3:43
"Discotheque Wreck"  – 3:17
"Middleman"  – 3:32
"Still the Rhythm"  – 3:32
"Ten Shades of Grey"  – 3:03
"Stab in the Back"  – 4:51
"Pretend Best Friend" – 3:47
"Time O the Signs"  – 3:25
"What the Doctor Ordered"  – 2:17
"Some People Say"  – 3:03
"What Makes You Tick" (includes hidden track) – 14:34

The hidden track is a very low quality collection of sounds recorded by the band in New York,  where the album was recorded.

Personnel
Personnel per booklet.

Terrorvision
 Tony Wright – vocals
 Shutty – drums
 Mark Yates – guitars
 Leigh Marklew – bass

Additional musicians
 Mark Phythian – programmer
 Audrey Riley – string arranger, backing vocals (track 5)
 Billy McGhee – string arranger
 Anita Madigan – backing vocals (tracks 2, 4 and 13)
 Enrico Tomasso – flugelhorn (track 9)
 Spry Galliano – percussion (track 8)

Production and design
 Gil Norton – producer, mixing
 Al Clay – engineer
 Mike Cyr – assistant engineer
 Chris Sheldon – mixing
 Elliot Ness – assistant
 John McDonnell – assistant
 Terrorvision – design
 Union Design – design
 Bob Gruen – photography

References

1994 albums
Terrorvision albums
Albums produced by Gil Norton